Schlieffen was a wolfpack of German U-boats that operated during the battle of the Atlantic in World War II.

Service history

Schlieffen was formed in  October 1943 to operate  against the North Atlantic convoy routes and comprised 14 boats.
It consisted of 6 boats from the disbanded group Rossbach, plus 7 others from bases in France and Germany, while another, joined from patrol in the Mid Atlantic.

Whilst moving into position a number of boats came under attack, principally from aircraft from USS Card, which was  operating against their re-fuelling operation.
The tanker  was attacked on 12 October, but suffered little damage; however, which was also attacked later that day, was forced to return to base. 
On 13 October two more boats ( and ) were attacked, and both were destroyed. 
Another two boats,  and U-455 collided; both were damaged, and  U-455 was forced to retire to base for repairs, while U-631, with her torpedo tubes out of action, was put on observation duties.

Schlieffen was disbanded after this attack, with a number of its boats forming the nucleus of a new group, code-named Siegfried.

U-boats involved

The name

Schlieffen was named for Count Alfred von Schlieffen, a Prussian field marshal and strategist of the 19th century.

References
 Jak P M Showell U-Boat Warfare: The Evolution of the Wolf-Pack  (2002) 
 Clay Blair : Hitler's U-Boat War [Volume 2]: The Hunted 1942-1945 (1998)  (2000 UK paperback ed.)

External links

Wolfpacks of 1943
Wolfpack Schlieffen